The Shelton Brothers Gang was an early Prohibition-era bootlegging gang based in southern Illinois. They were the main rivals of the famous bootlegger Charles Birger and his gang. In 1950, the Saturday Evening Post described the Sheltons as "America's Bloodiest Gang". Ancestors of the Shelton Brothers Gang trace their roots back to Ireland, under the surname "Hunter". There are still some descendants living in the St. Louis, Fairfield, IL and Bloomington IL area today.

History
Formed by Carl (born 1888), Earl (born 1890), and Bernie "Red" Shelton (born 1898) of "Geff" Jeffersonville, Wayne County, Illinois shortly after Prohibition came into effect in 1920, the gang operated in Williamson County, Illinois, making moonshine and other illegal alcoholic beverages. They eventually dominated both gambling and liquor distribution in Little Egypt until 1926, when a former ally, gangster Charles Birger, attempted to take over the Sheltons' bootlegging operations. This began a violent gang war, which saw both sides use homemade armored trucks and included an aerial bombing raid by the Sheltons on Birger's Shady Rest headquarters. 

Despite having more than fifty gunmen, the Shelton Brothers were unable to defeat Birger. Based on the testimony of Birger and Art Newman, the Shelton Brothers were convicted of an unsolved 1925 mail carrier robbery of $15,000 and sentenced to 25 years in prison.

Without its leaders, the gang slowly faded, and Birger dominated bootlegging in Southern Illinois, until he was hanged in 1928 after being convicted of ordering the murder of West City, Illinois, Mayor Joe Adams, a Shelton partisan.

After their eventual release from prison, the Shelton brothers moved in to control gambling in Peoria, Illinois. However, Carl and Bernie Shelton (in 1948) were both murdered on orders from former gang member Frank "Buster" Wortman, who had taken over the Shelton operations in their absence and dominated St. Louis' illegal gambling and other criminal activities until his death in 1968. Earl Shelton was also ambushed and shot, but he survived. After a third attempt on his life in the early 1950s, Earl and his family left Illinois for Florida. Earl died there in 1986 at age 96, the last member of the Shelton Brothers Gang.

References

Sources
Fox, Stephen. Blood and Power: Organized Crime in Twentieth-Century America. New York: William Morrow and Company, 1989. 
Kelly, Robert J. Encyclopedia of Organized Crime in the United States. Westport, Connecticut: Greenwood Press, 2000. 
Sifakis, Carl. The Mafia Encyclopedia. New York: Da Capo Press, 2005. 
Sifakis, Carl. The Encyclopedia of American Crime. New York: Facts on File Inc., 2001.

Further reading
 Angle, Paul M. 1952, Rep. 1993. Bloody Williamson - A Chapter in American Lawlessness. Urbana, Ill.: University of Illinois Press. .
 Galligan, George and Jack Wilkinson. 1927, Reprinted 1985. In Bloody Williamson. Marion, Ill.: Williamson County Historical Society.
 Pensoneau, Taylor. 2002. Brothers Notorious: The Sheltons - Southern Illinois' Legendary Gangsters. New Berlin, Illinois: Downstate Publications.
 Pensoneau, Taylor. 2010. Dapper & Deadly: The True Story of Black Charlie Harris. New Berlin, Illinois: Downstate Publications.
 Johnson, Ralph, and Jon Musgrave. 2010. Secrets of the Herrin Gangs. Marion, Ill.: IllinoisHistory.com. 96 pages.
 Shelton, Ruthie, and Jon Musgrave. 2013. Inside the Shelton Gang. Marion, Ill.: IllinoisHistory.com. 256 pages.
 Theising, Andrew J. 2003. Made in USA: East St. Louis, the Rise and Fall of an Industrial River Town. St. Louis: Virginia Publishing. 
 United States. Congress. Senate. Special Committee to Investigate Organized Crime in Interstate Commerce. Investigation of Organized Crime in Interstate Commerce: Hearings before a Special Committee to Investigate Organized Crime in Interstate Commerce. 1950.

External links
Life Magazine June 19, 1950 .pp.39-42 killings of Shelton Brothers
Historic Peoria: The Shelton Brothers
War in Illinois: Charlie Birger & The Shelton Gang
Bootlegging in Illinois by Nancy Nixon
The Sheltons, downstate gangsters by Bill Monson
The Sheltons on a genealogy page
Fairfield, Illinois location of Carl Shelton ambush

Gangs in Illinois
History of Illinois
Southern Illinois
Prohibition gangs
Williamson County, Illinois